My Fairy Tail Love Story is a 2018 Filipino romantic fantasy film, directed by Perci Intalan, starring Janella Salvador, Elmo Magalona and Kiko Estrada. It is produced by Regal Entertainment. It was released on February 14, 2018, by Regal Entertainment.

Plot 
Chantel (Janella Salvador) is a spoiled brat cursed to be a mermaid after she disturbed corals under the sea. With the help of her best friend Noah (Elmo Magalona), they go on a journey to find her Prince Charming who she believes will break the curse she's in.

Cast

Main cast 

 Janella Salvador as Chantel Quejada
 Elmo Magalona as Noah
 Kiko Estrada as DJ Ethan

Supporting cast 

 Kiray Celis as Missy
 Dominic Ochoa as Robert Quejada
 Dimples Romana as Natasha Quejada
 Kakai Bautista as Myrna
 Rubi Rubi as Nana Gurang
 Miles Ocampo as Anna

Production

Release 
The film released its 1-minute Official Teaser on August 31, 2017. The full trailer of the film was released on January 19, 2018. The film was released on February 14, 2018, under Regal Entertainment.

It is Rated G by the Movie and Television Review and Classification Board (MTRCB).

Critical response

References

External links 

2018 films
2018 fantasy films
Philippine fantasy films
Regal Entertainment films
Films based on The Little Mermaid
Philippine teen romance films
Philippine teen drama films
Philippine coming-of-age films
Philippine romantic comedy films
Films directed by Perci Intalan